Status Anxiety is a nonfiction book by Alain de Botton. It was first published in 2004 by Hamish Hamilton; subsequent publications have been by Penguin Books.

Central thesis
"Status anxiety" is a 21st-century phenomenon which is a result of capitalism, democracy, and an ostensibly egalitarian society, and is prevalent in countries where an inequality in income is evident. Status anxiety can be defined as the constant tension or fear of being perceived as "unsuccessful" by the society in materialistic terms.  Today, every individual constantly tries to outsmart the others to climb up the social ladder. The effects of status anxiety can be impulse buying, status consumption etc.
Meritocracy is a primary cause of status anxiety. Meritocracy is a society that believes that only the talented and the meritorious will end up at the top of the social ladder. Snobbery, envy, lovelessness are some other causes of status anxiety.

De Botton first noticed this phenomenon among the wealthy families of America. The Americans had a lavish lifestyle and most of it was just to make the "neighbours" envious. America had also witnessed the trend of "Famous for being famous". Botton even met the American motivational speaker Les Brown to know how motivational speaking works. He concluded that motivational speakers conducted their speeches to induce status anxiety among individuals. Motivational speaking is based on the fact that "No one is living up to their true potential and everyone has scope for improvement". De Botton challenged this and asked "What about those who want to achieve but lack the opportunities to do so?"

De Botton lays out the causes of and solutions to status anxiety as follows:

Causes:
 Lovelessness
 Expectation
 Meritocracy
 Snobbery
 Dependence

Solutions:
 Philosophy
 Art
 Politics
 Religion
 Bohemianism

Film
A two-hour documentary film about this thesis, also called Status Anxiety and written by Alain de Botton, was released in 2004. A version of it was shown in 2008 on Public Broadcasting Service channels like Boston WGBH-TV's digital channel WGBX-TV in the United States.

See also
 Social status
 Affluenza
Feelings of insignificance

References

External links 
 Status Anxiety - Alain de Botton website

Sociology books
2004 non-fiction books
Hamish Hamilton books
Books by Alain de Botton
Non-fiction books adapted into films
Social status
Anxiety
Conformity